Patrick Côté (born January 24, 1975) is a Canadian former professional ice hockey player. He played in six seasons in the National Hockey League (NHL), and later played the Ligue Nord-Américaine de Hockey in his native Quebec.

Biography
Côté was born in LaSalle, Quebec. As a youth, he played in the 1989 Quebec International Pee-Wee Hockey Tournament with a minor ice hockey team from Saint-Laurent, Quebec.

Selected 37th overall by the Dallas Stars in the 1995 NHL Entry Draft, Côté played only eight NHL games in three seasons with the Stars. He signed with the Nashville Predators where he scored three points (one goal and two assists) in 91 games over two seasons, picking up 313 penalty minutes. He also played six games for the Edmonton Oilers. He played several seasons in the Ligue Nord-Américaine de Hockey between 2001 and 2008.

In 2002, he was arrested in Malone, New York, after police found 30 pounds of marijuana in his car. He pleaded guilty to a reduced charge. On July 22, 2014, he was sentenced to prison for 30 months following his robbery of two banks in suburban Montreal.

Career statistics

References

External links

1975 births
Living people
Beauport Harfangs players
Canadian ice hockey left wingers
Dallas Stars draft picks
Dallas Stars players
Edmonton Oilers players
French Quebecers
Ice hockey people from Montreal
Nashville Predators players
People from LaSalle, Quebec